LA-3 is a constituency of Azad Kashmir Legislative Assembly which is currently represented by the Choudhary Muhammad Saeed of Pakistan Muslim League (N). It covers the area of Mirpur city in Mirpur District of Azad Kashmir, Pakistan.

Election 2016

elections were held in this constituency on 21 July 2016.

Mirpur District
Azad Kashmir Legislative Assembly constituencies